Klapsmühl' am Rathaus  is a cabaret theatre in Mannheim, Baden-Württemberg, Germany.

Theatres in Baden-Württemberg